1000 or thousand may refer to:
 1000 (number), a natural number
 AD 1000, a leap year in the Julian calendar
 1000 BC, a year of the Before Christ era
 1000 metres, a middle-distance running event
 1000°, a German electronic dance music magazine
 Thousand (comics), a Marvel Comics character
 Thousand (song), a song by Moby
 The Thousand (I Mille), the volunteers in the Expedition of the Thousand, a military action of the Italian Risorgimento, 1860

See also 
 1.000 (disambiguation)
 1000s (disambiguation), a decade, century or millennium
 $1000 (disambiguation), various banknotes